Drake & Josh Go Hollywood is a 2006 American television comedy film starring Drake Bell and Josh Peck from the Nickelodeon television series Drake & Josh. It first aired on January 6, 2006, and was released on VHS and DVD that same year on January 31. The film was the highest rated program on cable for the week with 5.4 million viewers.

Plot

For his school assignment, Josh must write an essay on one of the greatest adventures of his life, in which he struggles to think of anything fun or fulfilling he has ever done. Meanwhile, Drake is frustrated with his band manager for booking him and his band inappropriate gigs at boring venues, so Josh offers to become his new manager, using this experience to write his essay, which Drake reluctantly accepts. When their parents, Audrey and Walter, leave to go on a ten-day cruise, Drake and Josh drive their sister Megan to the airport to visit her friend Jessica in Denver, Colorado. However, Drake and Josh accidentally put Megan on the wrong flight to Los Angeles, California. Megan asks for a flight to Denver, but she is told she cannot because there is a storm in Denver, so she has to wait for the storms to clear up to go to Denver. Megan is angry at the boys for putting her on the wrong flight, but uses Walter's credit card to book a limousine service and a luxurious stay at the Chambroulay Hotel, which she comes to enjoy. When Drake and Josh fly to LA to find Megan and keep an eye on her, Josh meets a music producer in the hotel bathroom while playing one of Drake's songs on his laptop. The producer decides to book Drake an appearance on TRL for the next day.

However, Josh finds out that his G.O. (an MP3 player) was accidentally replaced on the flight with that of a man named Deegan due to an obese lady falling on Josh’s lap, containing blueprints for counterfeit money. When Deegan and his companion Brice Granger find and confront Drake and Josh on the G.O., the boys attempt to escape, driving around LA in a Viper stolen from Tony Hawk. When they think they have lost them, Drake and Josh get pulled over by two men claiming to be FBI agents. In reality, however, they are two more criminals who work with Deegan and Brice. The offenders abduct Drake and Josh and take them to a warehouse, locking them away. Back when Drake and Josh were at the San Diego airport, Josh had watched the news about some crooks who stole a monetary printing press from the U.S. Treasury Department three days before. Josh figures out that the group of criminals who kidnapped them, led by Milo McCreary, stole the printing press to forge counterfeit money. After making $500 million, the offenders plan to drown Drake and Josh and then escape to Brazil.

Meanwhile, Megan is disappointed at Drake and Josh abandoning her again and initially enjoys her free time in peace, but soon becomes concerned about them when she finds Brice's wallet in her hotel room containing the address to the warehouse. The following morning, she has her limo driver take her to the warehouse, where she finds Drake and Josh tied up. She tries to alert the Los Angeles Police Department, but the phone connection goes out. Therefore, she sneaks into the warehouse and turns on two large fans, which blow around all the money. In all the ensuing chaos, Drake and Josh finally escape and battle the crooks in a large fight until the police come and arrest the crooks for counterfeiting money. Megan uses some of the money she acquired from the warehouse to help her get to Denver, giving a portion as a tip to the limo driver. As a reward for capturing the crooks, the police offers to give Drake an escort to Sunset Studios for his TRL appearance using Tony Hawk's Viper, which Hawk's manager gives them permission to use because Hawk has three more Vipers. Drake and Josh arrive at TRL just in time, where Drake performs his new song, "Hollywood Girl". After his performance, the producer tells Drake he will pull some strings to allow him to audition for Spin City Records in New York City. With success in Drake's hands and Josh finally having something to write about for his greatest adventure, Drake and Josh cruise around and enjoy LA with two girls who have become fans of Drake's music during his TRL performance.

Cast
 Drake Bell as Drake Parker
 Josh Peck as Josh Nichols
 Miranda Cosgrove as Megan Parker
 Nancy Sullivan as Audrey Parker Nichols
 Jonathan Goldstein as Walter Nichols
 John J. York as Milo McCreary
 Matt Newton as Deegan
 Nick von Esmarch as Brice Granger
 Jorge Luis Abreu as Ah'Lee
 Jordan Belfi as Mitch Gordon
 Colleen Kirley as MTV secretary
 Dylan MacKenzie as Security guard
 Michael Ralph as Police chief
 Tony Hawk as himself

Music
Along with the music composed for the film by Michael Corcoran, there were several songs featured in the film.
 "Steppin' Out" – Safety Orange
 "To Save a Man" – Safety Orange
 "Boyz" – Saucy Monky
 "Find Your Own" – A Million Seeds
 "Little Bit Lonely" – Julie Gribble
 "It's True" – Odds Against Tomorrow
 "Hollywood Girl" – Drake Bell
 "Don't Preach" – Drake Bell
 "Get It Right" – Backhouse Mike
 "Highway to Nowhere" – Drake Bell
 "Summer Sun" – Safety Orange

Reception
The movie has no critic score on Rotten Tomatoes, but it contains a 78% score from the audience. On IMDb, it has a 6.9/10.

References

External links

 
 
 

Drake & Josh
2006 films
2006 television films
Nickelodeon original films
American comedy television films
American teen comedy films
Films directed by Steve Hoefer
2000s English-language films
2000s American films
2000s teen comedy films
Films about brothers